Bela barbiton is a species of sea snail, a marine gastropod mollusk in the family Mangeliidae.

Description
The length of the shell attains 8.5 mm, its diameter 3 mm.

Distribution
This species occurs in the Gulf of Oman

References

External links
  Tucker, J.K. 2004 Catalog of recent and fossil turrids (Mollusca: Gastropoda). Zootaxa 682:1-1295.

barbiton